The Missionary Sisters of the Sacred Heart is a Roman Catholic religious institute, founded on 25 March 1900 in Germany by a Dutch MSC, Fr. Hubert Linckens (1861–1922).  The institution is member of the Chevalier Family.

Notes

External links

Catholic missionary orders
Christian organizations established in 1900
Catholic religious institutes established in the 19th century
Catholic female orders and societies
1900 establishments in Germany